Le Duff is a surname, and may refer to;

Le Duff derives from du which means black in Breton. It is a sobriquet applying to a black hair person or a person with black complexion. Diminutives of this surname are; Le Duic, Le Duigo, Le Duigou.

 Louis Le Duff, French businessman, founder of Groupe Le Duff
 Dom Duff, Breton singer-songwriter
 Charlie LeDuff, American journalist, writer, and media personality
 Christelle Le Duff, French rugby player
 Séverin Le Duff de Mésonan, French politician
 Groupe Le Duff, a French restaurant conglomerate

See also
Duff (surname)

Breton-language surnames